Rucphen is a municipality and a town in the southern Netherlands between Roosendaal and Etten-Leur, south of the railway, but without a train-station.

Population centres

Topography

Dutch Topographic map of the municipality of Rucphen, June 2015

Notable people 

 Hendrik Detmers (1761 in Sprundel – 1825) a Dutch general in the Battle of Waterloo
 Dick Jaspers (born 1965 in Sint Willebrord) a Dutch professional carom billiards player 
 John Kerstens (born 1965 in Zegge) a Dutch politician and former trade union leader
 Donny Gorter (born 1988) a Dutch professional footballer with over 200 club caps
 Tessa ter Sluis (born 1995 in Sint Willebrord) a Dutch professional squash player

Gallery

See also
Heikant, Rucphen

References

External links 

 

 
Municipalities of North Brabant
Populated places in North Brabant